Eagle Mountain is the tallest and northernmost summit in the Lanfair Buttes is Eagle Mountain in the Mojave National Preserve in the Mojave Desert in San Bernardino County, California.  It rises to an elevation of 1338 feet.

References

Mountains of San Bernardino County, California
Mojave National Preserve
Lanfair Valley